Jahani is a surname. Notable people with the surname include:

 Abdul Bari Jahani,  Afghan writer
 Milad Jahani,  Iranian footballer
 Ghafour Jahani, Iranian football coach
 Khaled al-Johani, Saudi Arabian dissident
 Mohammed Al-Jahani, Saudi footballer
 Parviz Jahani, Kurdish writer
 Rahim Jahani, Afghan musician
 Sahar Jahani, American screenwriter

Arabic-language surnames
Persian-language surnames
Dari-language surnames